The Hukou incident (Chinese: 湖口兵變) also known as the Hukou Mutiny was an attempted coup d'état initiated by the deputy commander of the 1st Armor Division headquarters, General Chao Chih-hwa, on January 21, 1964.

Events of the coup 
The incident took place on January 21, 1964, in Hukou, Hsinchu, Taiwan. During a staff meeting at the 1st Armor Division headquarters, General Chao Chih-hwa (趙志華), then deputy commander of the armored battle group, criticized General Chou Chih-jo (周至柔), the Chief of the General Staff on charges of corruption and encouraged fellow officers at the meeting to revolt. He was reported as saying "Our leader is being deceived by treacherous people, we must move our forces to Taipei to remove them." ("當今主上為小人所蒙蔽，我們要把部隊開到台北勤王清君側") He was quickly arrested by two political warfare officers, but the Army nonetheless received erroneous information that the 1st Armor Division was on the move, and deployed troops to intercept the "rebels forces" that did not exist.

Chao was court-martialed and sentenced to death, but the sentence was never carried out. His sentence was later reduced to life in prison after the death of Chiang Kai-shek, and Chao died in 1983. Chao's superior Chiang Wei-kuo, who was Kai-shek's adopted son, was also punished and never held any real power in the military again.

References 

  
 
 

Taiwan under Republic of China rule
1964 in Taiwan
1960s coups d'état and coup attempts
Coup d'état attempts in Asia
Hsinchu